The New Village School (NVS) is a private school in Sausalito, California, with grades K-12.

The school began leasing space in the Martin Luther King facility of the City of Sausalito in 2009.

Curriculum
New Village has a year-round educational calendar. Twenty percent of the education is taught off campus. Curriculum is integrated, experiential and project-based. Music, art, nature and culture are strongly valued. Languages offered include Arabic, Mandarin Chinese, Russian, Japanese and Spanish. School trips are held every year from 3rd to 8th grade, including a 7th grade Europe trip, a three-week affair in from early to mid April, and an 8th grade vision quest in Peru.

Student life
The school holds a Winter Fair and the Cherry Blossom Festival, among other celebrations.

References

External links
 New Village School

Private K-12 schools in California
Schools in Marin County, California
Sausalito, California